Alcidodes comptus, is a species of weevil found in Sri Lanka.

Description
Typical body length is about 5.5 to 6.5 mm. Body reddish brown with light brown clothing. Elytra with a deep black, slightly wavy transverse band located shortly behind the middle. A black spot is found each on the shoulder and subapical bumps. Another spot is found each in the middle of the basal half of the elytra. Tarsi black or blackish brown. Forehead, pronotum, elytra and underside clothed with fairly dense, light brown scales. Proboscis is cylindrical, very narrow, slightly and evenly curved. Basal half of the proboscis is fine and densely dotted. Forehead flat and very densely scaled. Pronotum wide with a uniformly convex disc. Antescutellar flaps rounded, flattened or slightly indented. Eyeballs are weakly pronounced. Legs are slender, with very pointed and curved femur. Slightly curved rails consists with a large end pin that has two golden yellow long bristles on its inner base.

References 

Curculionidae
Insects of Sri Lanka
Beetles described in 1960